was a Japanese professional wrestling event co-produced by Apache Pro-Wrestling Army, Big Japan Pro Wrestling (BJW), DDT Pro-Wrestling (DDT), International Wrestling Association of Japan (IWA Japan), Kaientai Dojo (K-Dojo), Michinoku Pro Wrestling (M-Pro) and Osaka Pro Wrestling (OPW) on December 31, 2006 at Korakuen Hall, with the participation of wrestlers from Battlarts, Wrestling of Darkness 666, Toryumon Mexico, Dragon Gate (DG), World Wrestling Entertainment (WWE) and All Japan Pro Wrestling (AJPW).

The event featured a mixture of wrestlers from different independent promotions facing each other in a total of eight matches.

Production

Background
On December 9, 2005, the first Indy Summit was held at Korakuen Hall to bring together various promotions of the independent circuit in order to produce a unique joint show. The idea came from Eiji Tosaka, who was the Big Japan Pro Wrestling General Manager at the time. Following the success of the first event, a second edition was scheduled for December 31, 2006. The event was broadcast on Samurai! TV and Gaora (via the Puro-Kaku King mobile app).

Storylines
Indy Summit 2006 featured eight professional wrestling matches that resulted from scripted storylines, where wrestlers portrayed villains, heroes, or less distinguishable characters in the scripted events that built tension and culminated in a wrestling match or series of matches.

Results

References

2006 in professional wrestling
Active Advance Pro Wrestling
Big Japan Pro Wrestling shows
DDT Pro-Wrestling shows
International Wrestling Association of Japan
Osaka Pro Wrestling
Professional wrestling in Tokyo
Professional wrestling joint events